The 2013 Leinster Senior Cup Final was the last match of the 2013 Leinster Senior Cup. The match was played between 2013 League of Ireland champions St Patrick's Athletic and 2012 Leinster Senior Cup winners, Shamrock Rovers at Richmond Park on 20 October 2013. The match finished 1–0 to Shamrock Rovers, with James Chambers scoring the winner to secure Rovers their 18th Leinster Senior Cup title.

Match

See also
 2013 FAI Cup
 2013 League of Ireland
 2013 League of Ireland Cup
 2013 Setanta Sports Cup
 2013 FAI Cup Final

References

Leinster Senior Cup Final
Leinster Senior Cup (association football) finals
Leinster Senior Cup Final 2013
Leinster Senior Cup Final 2013